The first Yanukovych Government was the Ukrainian cabinet of ministers between 21 November 2002 and 5 January 2005, led by Prime Minister Viktor Yanukovych. Yanukovych had been elected Prime Minister of Ukraine with 234 votes, only 8 more than needed.

On December 1, 2004 (during the Orange Revolution) the Ukrainian Parliament passed a vote of no-confidence.  The government supported NATO membership of Ukraine (2002) and sent Ukrainian troops to Iraq in 2003.

Composition
Viktor Yanukovych – Prime Minister
Mykola Azarov – First Deputy Prime Minister
Vitaly Hayduk – Deputy Prime Minister for fuel and energy complex
Ivan Kyrylenko – Deputy Prime Minister
Dmytro Tabachnyk – Deputy Prime Minister for humanitarian issues
Serhy Ryzhuk – Agricultural Policy
Yury Smirnov – Interior Affairs
Vasyl Shevchuk – Environment and Natural Resources
Valery Khoroshkovsky – Economy and European Integration
Anatoliy Zlenko – Foreign Affairs
Hryhory Reva – Emergency Situations and Chernobyl Cleanup
Yury Bohutsky – Culture and the Regions
General Volodymyr Shkidchenko – Defence
Vasyl Kremen – Education and Science
Andry Pidayev – Health
Oleksandr Lavrynovych – Justice
Serhy Yermilov – Fuel and Energy
Mikhail Papiyev – Labour and Social Policy
Anatoliy Myalytsya – Industrial Policy
Heorhiy Kirpa – Transport

References

Ukrainian governments
2002 establishments in Ukraine
2005 disestablishments in Ukraine
Cabinets established in 2002
Cabinets disestablished in 2005
Viktor Yanukovych